Kheyrabad (also Romanized as Kheyrābād; also known as Khabīrābād and Khairābād) is a village in Kaghazkonan-e Markazi Rural District, Kaghazkonan District, Meyaneh County, East Azerbaijan Province, Iran. At the 2006 census, its population was 95, in 23 families.

References 

Populated places in Meyaneh County